Fotbal Club Metaloglobus București, commonly known as Metaloglobus București or simply as Metaloglobus, is a Romanian football club based in București, currently playing in the Liga II.

History

Metaloglobus București was founded in 1923 as the football team of the Metaloglobus factory, a powerful factory that was founded in the same year by the Austrian industrialist Manfréd Weiss. The factory has been developed more in the communist period and produced all kinds of objects made of steel and iron from lanterns, bullets, boilers and from 1965 they started to produce toys. After the 1989 Romanian Revolution, the factory began to have financial problems and in 2000 was bought by Syrian businessman Imad Kassas.

The football team experienced success. They played in amateur leagues of Bucharest almost all of its existence, until 2011 when they won Liga IV Bucharest and qualified for the Liga III play-off where they lost against Rapid Clejani, Giurgiu County champions. After a lot of the Liga III teams abandoned the competition in that summer, Metaloglobus was invited in Liga III. In five consecutive seasons, the team was always ranked in the top half and their best performance was the third place in the 2012–13 and 2015–2016 seasons.

Metaloglobus finished first at the end of the 2016–17 season, 11 points in front of 2nd-placed Viitorul Domnești, and were promoted to the Liga II for the first time in their history. Their first season in the second tier was a difficult one, and they were unable to avoid the relegation zone as they finished 16th. However, they were spared from going down after the withdrawal of fifth-placed Afumați.

Stadium
The club plays its home games on the Stadionul Metaloglobus from the Bucharest neighborhood of Pantelimon. The stadium was under renovations between 2011 and 2015; during this period the team played its home matches on Stadionul Clinceni and on Stadionul CNAF.

Honours
Liga III
Winners (1): 2016–17
Liga IV – Bucharest
Winners (1): 2010–11

Players

First-team squad

Out on loan

Club Officials

Board of directors

Current technical staff

League history

References

External links
 
 

 
Association football clubs established in 1923
Football clubs in Bucharest
Liga II clubs
Liga III clubs
Liga IV clubs
1923 establishments in Romania